The Suhanko mine is one of the largest platinum group element projects in Finland and in the world. The mine is located in the north of the country in Ranua, Lapland. The project is estimated to host over 10 million ounces of combined palladium and platinum, with valuable quantities of copper, nickel and gold.

See also

References 

Gold mines in Finland
Copper mines in Finland
Nickel mines in Finland
Ranua